The Brescia–Parma railway is a railway line between Lombardy and Emilia-Romagna, Italy. It was opened from 1884 to 1893.

Services are operated by Trenord.  For most of the day there is an hourly service in each direction.  Journey time is approximately 2 hours.

See also 
 List of railway lines in Italy

References

Footnotes

Sources
 
 

Railway lines in Emilia-Romagna
Railway lines in Lombardy
Railway lines opened in 1893